Hamburg City Hall is the seat of local government of the Free and Hanseatic City of Hamburg, Germany.  It is the seat of the government of Hamburg and as such, the seat of one of Germany's 16 state parliaments. The Rathaus is located in the Altstadt quarter in the city center, at the Rathausmarkt square, and near the lake Binnenalster and the central station. Constructed from 1886 to 1897, the city hall still houses its original governmental functions with the office of the First Mayor of Hamburg and the meeting rooms for the Parliament and the Senate (the city's executive branch).

History

After the old city hall was destroyed in the great fire of 1842, it took almost 44 years to build a new one. The present building was designed by a group of seven architects, led by Martin Haller. Construction started in 1886 and the new city hall was inaugurated in 1897.  Its cost was 11 million German gold marks, about €80 million. On 26 October 1897 at the official opening ceremony the First Mayor Johannes Versmann received the key of the city hall.

In the postwar period, various heads of state visited Hamburg and its City Hall — among them  Emperor Haile Selassie I, the Shahanshah Mohammed Reza Pahlavi in 1955, and in 1965 Queen Elizabeth II. An emotionally moving service of remembrance was held on the market-square for the victims of the North Sea flood of 1962. Happier moments were the celebrations of Hamburger SV as German football champions, the last time though in 1983.

In 1971 a room in the tower was only discovered accidentally during a search for a document fallen behind a filing cabinet. So there is a probability that there are even more rooms than the currently counted 647 rooms.

Architecture

On the outside the architectural style is Neo-Renaissance, which is abandoned inside for several historical elements. It is one of the few completely preserved buildings of historicism in Hamburg. Built in a period of wealth and prosperity, in which the Kingdom of Prussia and its military defeated France in the Franco-German War and the German Empire was formed, the look of the new Hamburg Rathaus was intended to express this wealth and also the independence of the State of Hamburg and Hamburg's republican traditions.

The balcony is surmounted by a mosaic of Hamburg's patron goddess Hammonia, the city's coat of arms and an inscription of the city's motto in Latin: 
The courtyard is decorated with a Hygieia fountain. Hygieia as the goddess of health and hygiene in Greek mythology and its surrounding figures represents the power and pureness of the water. It was built in remembrance of the cholera epidemic in 1892, the former technical purpose was air cooling in the city hall.

Interiors

Functions

The lobby is a public area used for concerts and exhibitions. It is open to the public. The emperor's hall in the first floor is the second-largest representation hall, named after Wilhelm II and functions as a room for official presentations. The mayor's hall was planned as a small meeting room. In the room as of 2008 the entry in the city's Golden Book take place, which was done by many dignitaries including the former German President Paul von Hindenburg and the Dalai Lama. In the left wing is the floor of the Hamburg Parliament. The 121 representatives meet in a room that was renovated during the Nazi era. Only three fields on the ceiling shows its original decoration.

Gallery
The Rathaus takes part in the Long Night of Museums. Even it is not a museum itself, and there are many virtual and historical details. During the Long Night of Museums in Hamburg the motto is "long night in centre of power".

Neighborhood
The city hall is located in the center of Hamburg. In front of it is a market-square, the Rathausmarkt, used for events and festivals. At the rear of the town hall is the Hamburg Stock Exchange. The main shopping street, Mönckebergstraße, connects the town hall with the central station. The Binnenalster with the Jungfernstieg station and quay for the Alster ships is directly north of the Rathaus. A nearby architectural landmark is the St. Peter's Church.

References

External links

 Hamburgische Bürgerschaft - Welcome to Hamburg City Hall! official website of the Hamburg Parliament (Hamburgische Bürgerschaft)
 City Hall on hamburg.de
 Picture of the Hamburg City Hall
 Virtual tour of City Hall directly

Government buildings completed in 1897
Buildings and structures in Hamburg-Mitte
City and town halls in Germany
German Landtag buildings
Heritage sites in Hamburg
Tourist attractions in Hamburg
Renaissance Revival architecture in Germany
Official residences of subnational executives
Office buildings in Germany